The 1950 United States Senate election in Colorado took place on November 7, 1950. Incumbent Republican Senator Eugene Millikin ran for re-election to his second full term. He faced a strong challenge from Congressman John A. Carroll, the Democratic nominee, in the general election. Carroll ultimately lost, but despite facing considerable headwinds nationwide, held Millikin to the narrowest victory of his career.

Democratic primary

Candidates
 John A. Carroll, U.S. Congressman from Colorado's 1st congressional district

Results

Republican primary

Candidates
 Eugene Millikin, incumbent U.S. Senator

Results

General election

Results

References

1950
Colorado
United States Senate